Kildonan may refer to:

Kildonan, Skye, a crofting township on the island of Skye
Kildonan, Sutherland, a parish containing the village of Helmsdale.
Kildonan railway station, in this area
Strath of Kildonan in Sutherland, Scotland
Kildonan, Arran, a village on the Isle of Arran, Scotland
Kildonan, Uist, a crofting township on the island of Uist.
Kildonan, Manitoba, a former Rural Municipality in Manitoba, Canada
Kildonan (Manitoba electoral district), a provincial electoral district in Manitoba
Kildonan, British Columbia, a locality near Alberni Inlet, British Columbia
Kildonan Lake, British Columbia
Kildonan, Zimbabwe

Parts of the city of Winnipeg, Manitoba:
 East Kildonan, Winnipeg
 North Kildonan, Winnipeg
 West Kildonan, Winnipeg
 Old Kildonan